The Eurasian blue tit (Cyanistes caeruleus) is a species of bird.

Blue tit may also refer to:

 African blue tit (Cyanistes teneriffae), a species of bird
 Blue tit (Chliaria kina or Hypolycaena kina), a species of butterfly
 A cultivar of the plum Prunus domestica

Bird common name disambiguation pages